Kuhn is a surname of German origin. It may refer to the following:

 Abraham Kuhn (banker) (1819–1892), German-American founder of Kuhn, Loeb & Co.
 Abraham Kuhn (otolarynologist) (1838–1900), Alsatian otolaryngologist
 Adam Kuhn (1741–1817), American naturalist and physicist
 Albert Kuhn (1860–1934), Washington state pioneer and businessman
 Alvin Boyd Kuhn (1880–1963), American scholar of mythology and linguistics
 Annette Kuhn, British author, cultural historian, and educator
 Anthony Kuhn, NPR correspondent in Beijing, China
 Bob Kuhn, mayor of Glendora, California
 Bradley M. Kuhn (born 1973), American free software activist
 Bowie Kuhn (1926–2007), American baseball commissioner
 Charles Kuhn (1892–1989), cartoonist
 Charles L. Kuhn (1902-1985), American academic and art historian
 Deanna Kuhn (born 1944), professor of psychology
 Franz Kuhn (1884–1961), German lawyer and translator of Chinese novels
 Franz Felix Adalbert Kuhn (1812–1881), German philologist and folklorist
 Frédéric Kuhn (born 1968), French hammer thrower
 Friedrich Adalbert Maximilian Kuhn (1842–1894), German botanist
 Fritz Kuhn (born 1955), German Green Party politician
 Fritz Julius Kuhn (1896–1951), leader of the German American Bund
 Harold W. Kuhn (1925–2014), American mathematician, John von Neumann Theory Prize winner, developer of Kuhn poker
 Heino Kuhn (born 1984), South African cricketer
 Ida Soule Kuhn (1869–1952), American political and social activist
 Johannes von Kuhn (1806–1887), German Catholic theologian
 Joseph Kuhn-Régnier (1873–1940), French illustrator
 John Kuhn (born 1982), American football player
 Judy Kuhn (born 1958), American singer and actress, Tony Award winner
 Keegan Kuhn, American documentary filmmaker, director, producer, and professional musician
 Köbi Kuhn (1943–2019), Swiss football coach
 Maggie Kuhn (1905–1995), American activist, founder of the Gray Panthers
 Markus Kuhn (American football) (born 1986), German-born American football player
 Markus Kuhn (computer scientist) (born 1971), German computer scientist
 Mickey Kuhn (1932–2022), American child actor
 Oliver Kuhn (1898–1968), "Doc Kuhn", American football, baseball and basketball player
 Oskar Kuhn (1908–1990), German paleontologist
 Philip A. Kuhn (1933–2016), Harvard professor and China expert
 Paul Kuhn (disambiguation), several people
 Peter Kuhn (1955–2009), American race car driver
 Richard Kuhn (1900–1967), Austrian biochemist, 1938 Nobel Prize in Chemistry
 Rick Kuhn (born 1955), Australian Marxist economist and lecturer
 Robert Lawrence Kuhn (born 1944), American author, investment banker, China specialist and PBS TV documentary host
 Robert Verrill Kuhn (known as Bob Keane, 1922–2009), American clarinetist, producer and label owner
 Roland Kuhn, Swiss psychiatrist
 Simone Kuhn (born 1980), Swiss beach volleyball player
 Steve Kuhn (born 1938), American jazz pianist
 Thomas Kuhn (1922–1996), American philosopher and historian of science, author of The Structure of Scientific Revolutions
 Walt Kuhn (1877–1949), American painter

Kihn (variant)
 Greg Kihn, American musician and novelist
 Martin Kihn, American writer and digital marketer
 W. Langdon Kihn (1898–1957), American painter and illustrator

See also 
 Kühn, disambiguation
 Kühn (surname)
 Kuhn Island, an island of Greenland
 Kuhn (.hack), a fictional character in the .hack franchise
 Kuhn, Loeb & Co., an American investment bank
 KUHN, a Louisiana-based radio station

References

German-language surnames
Surnames from given names